Ziziphus obtusifolia is a species of flowering plant in the buckthorn family known by several common names, including lotebush, graythorn, gumdrop tree, and Texas buckthorn.

Distribution
The plant is native to the South Central and Southwestern United States, the California deserts, and central through northern Mexico.

It grows in shrubby and scrubby desert habitats, grasslands and prairie, woodlands, and other habitat types. It can be found among desert plants such as honey mesquite, smooth mesquite, ocotillo and creosote.

Description

The leaves are deciduous and are absent for much of the year, leaving the shrub a naked thicket of gray twigs coated in waxy whitish hairs. The ends of the twigs taper into sharp-tipped thorns. The thick, glandular gray or green leaves have oval blades 1 or 2 centimeters long.

The inflorescence is a cluster of several dull yellow-green flowers. The fruit is a mealy, juicy drupe containing one seed.

The fruit provides food for many species of birds and mammals. Birds use the shrub as a nesting site and the southern plains woodrat uses the twigs to build its houses.

References

External links
CalFlora Database: Ziziphus obtusifolia (Lotebush)
NPIN−Lady Bird Johnson Wildflower Center Native Plant Information Network: Ziziphus obtusifolia (Lotebush, Lote-bush condalia)
CalFlora Database: Ziziphus obtusifolia var. canescens (Grey leaved Abrojo, graythorn, lotebush)
Jepson Manual (JM2) eFlora: Ziziphus obtusifolia var. canescens
UC Photos gallery — Ziziphus obtusifolia var. canescens 

obtusifolia
Flora of the California desert regions
Flora of the Chihuahuan Desert
Flora of Central Mexico
Flora of Northeastern Mexico
Flora of Northwestern Mexico
Flora of Oklahoma
Flora of the Sonoran Deserts
North American desert flora
Trees of the South-Central United States
Trees of the Southwestern United States
Natural history of the Colorado Desert
Natural history of the Mojave Desert
Flora without expected TNC conservation status